Varol Akman (born 8 June 1957, Antalya, Turkey) is Professor of Computer Engineering in Bilkent University, Ankara. 

An academic of engineering background, Akman obtained his B.A in Electrical Engineering from the Middle East Technical University in Ankara. He then continued his graduate studies and obtained his Ph.D  from Rensselaer Polytechnic Institute under the tutelage of influential logician William Randolph Franklin.

Among his research interests are artificial intelligence, linguistics, social aspects of the Internet, Donald Davidson's philosophy and pragmatics. His articles have been published in journals such as Pragmatics and Cognition, Computational Intelligence, Minds and Machines, and Language and Communication.

He was influential in the founding of the Department of Philosophy in Bilkent University.

References

External links
list of publications
dblp computer science bibliography profile
Web of Science profile
Scopus profile
Semantic Scholar profile
Google Scholar profile
PhilPeople profile
ORCID profile
ResearchGate profile

Turkish non-fiction writers
Turkish scientists
Turkish computer scientists
1957 births
Living people
Rensselaer Polytechnic Institute alumni